Sergi Gómez Solà (born 28 March 1992) is a Spanish professional footballer who plays for RCD Espanyol as a central defender.

Club career

Barcelona

Born in Arenys de Mar, Barcelona, Catalonia, Gómez arrived in FC Barcelona's youth academy at the age of 14. Even though he appeared in only three Segunda División B games for the B side in the 2009–10 season, he would later play an essential role in their Segunda División successful promotion play-offs, after injury to fellow youth graduate Andreu Fontàs.

On 13 August 2010, as first-team manager Pep Guardiola provided Barças Spanish internationals with needed rest, Gómez was included in the nineteen-man squad to face Sevilla FC in the first leg of the 2010 edition of the Supercopa de España. He made his competitive debut in that match, playing 90 minutes in a 3–1 away loss.

Gómez was exclusively associated to the youth teams and the reserves during his spell at the Camp Nou, however.

Celta
On 1 July 2014, free agent Gómez signed a three-year contract with RC Celta de Vigo. He made his La Liga debut on 13 September when he came as a 75th-minute substitute in a 2–2 home draw against Real Sociedad, and he finished his first season with 22 appearances to help to a final eighth position.

Gómez scored his first goal in the top flight on 5 November 2017, opening an eventual 3–1 win over Athletic Bilbao also at Balaídos.

Sevilla
Gómez joined Sevilla FC on 23 July 2018, on a four-year deal. An undisputed starter under Pablo Machín, he was deemed surplus to requirements after the appointment of Julen Lopetegui.

Espanyol
On 28 July 2021, Gómez signed a three-year contract with RCD Espanyol, newly promoted to the top tier.

International career
After representing Spain at under-17, under-19 and under-21 levels, Gómez was called up to the full side by manager Luis Enrique on 15 March 2019, for two UEFA Euro 2020 qualifying matches against Norway and Malta.

Career statistics

HonoursBarcelonaSupercopa de España: 2010SevillaUEFA Europa League: 2019–20Spain U19UEFA European Under-19 Championship: 2011Spain U17'
FIFA U-17 World Cup third place: 2009

References

External links

1992 births
Living people
People from Maresme
Sportspeople from the Province of Barcelona
Spanish footballers
Footballers from Catalonia
Association football defenders
La Liga players
Segunda División players
Segunda División B players
CE Mataró players
FC Barcelona Atlètic players
FC Barcelona players
RC Celta de Vigo players
Sevilla FC players
RCD Espanyol footballers
UEFA Europa League winning players
Spain youth international footballers
Spain under-21 international footballers
Catalonia international footballers